is an unreleased Chinese-Japanese animated steampunk fantasy film directed by Fumikazu Satou. It would have been the first feature film produced by anime veteran Hiroshi Negishi's Zero-G animation studio, with that status being taken by their film adaptation of the manga series Break of Dawn. It was originally set to be released by AEON Entertainment on February 7, 2020, but due to production issues, the film has been removed from the 2020 release schedule. Jewelpet Attack Travel!, a short film based on Sanrio's Jewelpet franchise and directed by Negishi for Ashi Productions, was set to be attached to it; and was later rescheduled for release as an original net animation on May 14, 2022, in a livestream on Niconico Live. During that livestream, it was confirmed that the film would not be released at any point in the foreseeable future.

Plot

Settings
The film is set in China's Sichuan province, and is based around the ancient Sanxingdui ruins in Guanghan.

Synopsis
Thousands of years ago, a large civilization existed deep underground. There, an artificial sun called “skylight” brought light to its people. In ancient times, the “Masked King” Sheargan appeared, sealed the "Kukuri" that plagued the underground world, and turned on the skylight to release people from the darkness. Sheargan was worshiped as a savior and became an absolute being. Serving the Sheargan and managing the skylight is a family whose mission is to illuminate the dark. Siblings Lilyn and Sauda are searching for the fuel for the skylight, "Raige", as it is getting less and less. While doing so, Lilyn meets a man names Masala, who resides in a village where the skylight has been turned off after angering Sheargan. While working with Masala, Lilyn and Sauda get to know the existence of a world that they had not seen. The story will change the fate of the brother and sister, as well as the underground world.

Voice cast

References

External links 
  

2020s unfinished films
Chinese animated films
Films set in Sichuan
Films impacted by the COVID-19 pandemic
Japanese fantasy adventure films
Steampunk anime and manga
Zero-G (studio)
Japanese animated films
Unreleased films